Cosmotron is the sixth studio album released by Skank in 2003.

Track listing 
 "Supernova" (Samuel Rosa/Fausto Fawcett) - 4:37
 "As Noites" (Samuel Rosa/Chico Amaral) - 4:52
 "Pegadas na Lua" (Samuel Rosa/Humberto Effe) - 4:35
 "Amores Imperfeitos" (Samuel Rosa/Chico Amaral) - 4:13
 "Por um Triz" (Samuel Rosa/Rodrigo F. Leão) - 4:08
 "Dois Rios" (Samuel Rosa/Lô Borges/Nando Reis) - 4:43
 "Nômade" (Samuel Rosa/Chico Amaral) - 6:53
 "Vou Deixar" (Samuel Rosa/Chico Amaral) - 4:34
 "Formato Mínimo" (Samuel Rosa/Rodrigo F. Leão) - 5:12
 "Resta um Pouco Mais" (Lelo Zaneti/Chico Amaral) - 3:51
 "Os Ofendidos" (Samuel Rosa/Chico Amaral) - 3:47
 "É Tarde" (Samuel Rosa/Chico Amaral) - 4:47
 "Um Segundo" (Samuel Rosa/Chico Amaral) - 4:05
 "Sambatron" (Samuel Rosa/Chico Amaral) - 5:10

Personnel 
Skank
 Haroldo Ferretti - drums
 Henrique Portugal - keyboards, Hammond organ, piano
 Samuel Rosa - vocals, acoustic guitar, electric guitar
 Lelo Zaneti - bass

Guest
 Paco Pigalle - vocals on "Nômade"

Production
 Skank - production
 Tom Capone - production, recording, mixing
 Bruno Ferretti, Renato Cipriano - recording
 Marco Diniz, Thiago Peixoto - recording assistants
 Álvaro Alencar - mixing
 Fernando Rebelo, Tomás Magno - mixing assistants
 Ricardo Garcia - mastering
 Fernando Furtado - executive producer
 Bruno Batista - production coordinator
 William Oliveira - production assistant
 Frederico Toledo, Marco Antônio Otoni, William Oliveira - studio assistants

Design
 Marcus Barão - graphic project
 Daniella Conolly - graphic supervisor
 Weber Pádua - graphic project, photography

References 

2003 albums
Skank (band) albums
Latin Grammy Award for Best Portuguese Language Rock or Alternative Album